The Special Forces Regiment (Airborne) is a Special Operations Forces unit of the Philippine Army. The unit is based on and continually trains with its American counterpart, the U.S. Army Special Forces (Green Berets).

The basic combat organization of the Special Forces is the 12-man Special Forces Team. An SF Team will have at least one of each SF MOS present in the team.

History
The regiment was established in the 1960s by then Captain Fidel V. Ramos PA (INF), primarily trained in both unconventional warfare and psychological warfare. The regiment has close ties and trains with the United States Army Special Forces (Green Berets) The unit encountered manpower issues when SF commandos were sent to Vietnam under the 1 Philippines Civic Action Group, Vietnam (PHILCAG), which forced commanders to train new recruits to refill the ranks.

The SFR was responsible for creating the Civilian Home Defense Forces (CHDF), later re-named as the Civilian Armed Forces Geographical Unit (CAFGU).

The unit changed its name from Special Forces to Home Defense Forces in June 1968 to avoid being disbanded when it was revealed that special forces commandos trained Muslim Filipino soldiers for operations in Sabah. At the time, the Home Defense Forces Group consisted of A Teams (Operational Detachment) and B Teams.

In 1970, the HDFG was placed under Task Force Pasig of the Presidential Security Command.

Operations
A British businessman, Allan Hyrons, 70, and his wife, Wilma, were rescued by the 2nd Special Forces Battalion with support from the 11th Infantry “Alakdan” Division who found them abandoned at the forested areas of Mt. Piahan, the boundary of Barangays Silangkan and Kaha in Parang, Sulu in the morning of 25 November 2019. SFR commandos engaged Abu Sayyaf Group fighters during the operation.

Structure
The following are subordinate battalions of the Special Forces Regiment (Airborne):

Headquarters
 Headquarters & Headquarters Company
 1st Special Forces Battalion "Hunter Killer"
 2nd Special Forces Battalion "Sabertooth"
 3rd Special Forces Battalion "Arrowhead"
 4th Special Forces Battalion (Riverine) "Dolphin Warriors"
 5th Special Forces Battalion "Primus Inter Pares"
 6th Special Forces Battalion "Lionheart"
 Special Forces School

Notable Officers
 Lieutenat Colonel Vercisio San Jose Jr. 
 Captain Harold Mark Juan [(Hitman)]
 General Fidel Ramos (first Commanding Officer)
 General Lisandro Abadia
 General Angelo Reyes
 Lieutenant General Voltaire Gazmin
 Lieutenant General Arturo Ortiz [Medal of Valor]

Training
Like the Scout Rangers, members of the Special Forces Regiment of the Philippine Army are also highly trained in counterinsurgency. Upon assignment to the Special Forces, soldiers are made to undergo the Basic Airborne Course. They, later-on, undergo the Special Forces Operations Course – an eight-month course that equips each SF soldier in the basics of Special Forces and unconventional warfare operations. Each member of the SF Regiment may opt to undergo specialty courses as well after finishing the Special Forces basic course.

These include, but is not limited to, training in advanced hand-to-hand combat, advanced land navigation for control of airborne operations, advanced parachuting, advanced reconnaissance, amphibious warfare, anti-guerrilla, combat diving, combat search and rescue, counterterrorism, coastal patrolling, combat and patrolling techniques in urban areas, defusing and disposal of bombs, fast tactical shooting, forward air control, gathering intelligence, hostage rescue, irregular warfare operations, light and heavy weapons, marksmanship, medical evacuation, military technology, NBCR on operations in contaminated environments, parachute rigger, psychological operations (PSYOPS), riverine warfare operations, tactical emergency medical, tracking tactics, use of tactical vehicles, VBSS operation, as well as VIP security training in preparation for reassignment with the Presidential Security Group.

The unit has trained with the Green Berets and the Australian SASR.

References

Bibliography

 The Special Forces School, Philippine Army Special Forces Operations Manual PAM 3-071, 2008, SFR(A).
 

Special forces of the Philippines
Airborne units and formations
Regiments of the Philippines
Military special forces regiments
Military counterterrorist organizations